Owen Ash Weingott (21 June 1921 – 12 October 2002) was an Australian actor, director and drama teacher. Although primarily working in theatre, he appeared on radio and television in serials and made for television films and voice overs. Weingott was vice-president of the Australian actors union, the Media, Entertainment and Arts Alliance. He appeared in the very first Australian soap opera Autumn Affair, opposite Muriel Steinbeck, and is well known for his role as Mr. Walter Bertram, a demented school principal in the first season of Home and Away

Early life
Weingott was born in Sydney in 1921 and when he was 15 he began studying and performing with the Independent Theatre, then in King St., Sydney, under producer Doris Fitton, later at the Savoy Theatre in Bligh St.: 1066 and All That, Six Characters in Search of an Author, and Judgement Day. He learnt to fence from Frank Stuart at the Sydney Swords Club. He was given a role in the Insect Play at the Independent in 1941.

In 1939 he left Sydney Boys High School and studied Economics at Sydney University until joining the Royal Australian Air Force (RAAF). 
In 1945, after his war service, having graduated as Sergeant, he studied Physical Education and returned to the Independent Theatre, now at North Sydney, performing as Young Siward in Macbeth. Stuart, who had choreographed the duel in Macbeth, advised Fitton to cast Weingott in future when duels where required. The next year, 1946, Fitton produced Hamlet and cast Weingott as Laertes (who duels with Hamlet), a role he played five more times, one being a live broadcast from the ABC-TV studios at Gore Hill.

Career; theatre and radio
On Stuart's suggestion Weingott studied period duelling and became a professional teacher choreographing 400+ duels. In 1971 he played Sinbad the Sailor in a pantomime directed by Bill Orr.

Weingott's first radio work was in 1945 in The Scarlet Widow, a serial for 2CH. He starred as Papa in Samuel Taylor's The Happy Time.

In 1951 he played Cornwall in John Alden’s King Lear at St. James Hall, also choreographing the duels and the eye-gouging scene. In 1952 he joined Alden's national tour of a Shakespearian play season playing Edgar in King Lear, Demetrius in A Midsummer Night’s Dream, Antigonus in The Winter’s Tale, The Prince of Morocco, Tubal and Bassanio in The Merchant of Venice.

Prior to the Alden tour he had played Mephistopheles in Goethe's Faust at the Independent Theatre, and on his return he approached Sydney John Kay for a position in his Mercury Theatre. Again he played Papa in The Happy Time, other plays in which he was involved as a leading actor for the Mercury included As You Like It, Ring Round the Moon, Tovarich, Charley's Aunt, Chekhov’s The Proposal and a revue called Happily Ever After. At the Independent he played the lead in two plays by Arthur Miller, as Eddie Carbone in A View from the Bridge (1959) and as Victor in The Price (1970). He worked with Ray Milland in the play Hostile Witness (1967), John Mills in the film Adam's Woman (1970) and Michael Redgrave in John Mortimer's play A Voyage Round My Father (1973).

Television
A pioneer of Australian television, in October 1958-59 Weingott was one of a sustaining cast of five actors who supported Muriel Steinbeck in Australia's first locally made television serial for ATN Channel 7, Autumn Affair. 

He was in ABN 2's television drama Sixty Point Bold, and its first live-to-air production of Hamlet, inevitably as Laertes. He then played Shylock in The Merchant of Venice and Caliban in The Tempest, all directed by Alan Burke. He also played in many Shakespeare plays for ABC Radio. 

In the ABC's The Stranger (Australian TV series), produced in 1964-1965, he appeared in nine episodes as Professor Mayer. In 1966, Weingott had a starring role in the television sitcom The Private World of Miss Prim. With many guest roles to his credit, he appeared in such hit series as Number 96 (TV series) and The Box (TV series) and appeared as school principal Mr. Walter Bertram in Home and Away, during the first season in 1988.

Further theatre and teaching 
In 1957 at the Independent Theatre he played the co-lead with Peter O'Shaughnessy in Brigid Boland's The Prisoner, he was directed by John Alden as Shylock in The Merchant of Venice; he produced Leonard Teale as Macbeth; and he played the Inquisitor in Jean Anouilh's The Lark, directed by Cardamatis.

He was a foundation teacher at the National Institute of Dramatic Art, and through the 1960s he worked as an actor with the Old Tote Theatre in plays which included The Playboy of the Western World, The Cherry Orchard, The Caucasian Chalk Circle and The School Mistress.

In 1974 he was invited to the Mitchell College of Advanced Education, Bathurst, to direct King Lear and to play the lead. In 1976 he returned as a full-time lecturer in Theatre Arts, remaining for ten years. He returned to Sydney in 1986.
He died in 2002, aged 81.

References

(Above is adapted from a published interview by Lyn Murphy & Richard Lane)

National Institute of Dramatic Art Archive, personal papers, photographs, encrypted radio scripts and play texts, costume sketches and painted characteurs;

Australian Film & TV Companion, by Tony Harrison;

The Independent Theatre’s 40th Anniversary booklet;

Interview with Owen Weingott (1999) and personal knowledge.

External links

Australian male television actors
Australian male stage actors
1921 births
2002 deaths
Australian male radio actors
Royal Australian Air Force personnel